The 2018–19 Stade Malherbe Caen season was the 106th season of the club since its creation in 1913, the 18th, in Ligue 1. Caen competed in three domestic competitions - Ligue 1, the Coupe de France, and the Coupe de la Ligue. The club finished the league season in 19th place and were relegated to Ligue 2 for the 2019–20 campaign, ending a spell of five consecutive seasons in the top flight.

Players

Current squad

Competitions

Ligue 1

League table

Results summary

Results by round

Matches

Coupe de France

Coupe de la Ligue

Goalscorers

References

Caen
Stade Malherbe Caen seasons